Nageia formosensis is a species of conifer in the family Podocarpaceae. It is found only in Taiwan.

References
 Conifer Specialist Group 2000.  Nageia formosensis.   2006 IUCN Red List of Threatened Species.   Downloaded on 10 July 2007.

Podocarpaceae
Data deficient plants
Taxonomy articles created by Polbot
Endemic flora of Taiwan